Broken City is a 2013 American crime film starring Mark Wahlberg and Russell Crowe.

Broken City may also refer to:

 "Broken City" (comics), a 2003–2004 Batman storyline
 "Broken City", a song by Audioslave from Revelations
Broken City, a competitive indoor percussion group from Lake Elsinore, CA that competes in Percussion Independent World (PIW) class in WGI competition.

See also
 This Broken City, an EP by Vedera